Cecidoses argentinana is a moth of the family Cecidosidae. It was described by Juan Brèthes in 1917. They are known for their particularly deep colours and their tendency to investigate intruders to their territory. It is found in South America.

References

Cecidosidae
Moths described in 1917
Moths of South America
Taxa named by Juan Brèthes